Unity Day (also called Day of People's Unity or National Unity Day)  is a national holiday in Russia held on . It commemorates the popular uprising which expelled Polish–Lithuanian occupation forces from Moscow by a militia from Nizhny Novgorod in November 1612, and more generally the end of the Time of Troubles and turning point of the Polish-Russian War (1605–1618).

The day's name alludes to the idea that all classes of Russian society united to preserve Russian statehood when there was neither a tsar nor a patriarch to guide them. In 1613 tsar Mikhail Romanov instituted a holiday named Day of Moscow’s Liberation from Polish Invaders. It was celebrated in the Russian Empire until 1917, when it was replaced with a commemoration of the Russian Revolution. Unity Day was reinstituted by the Russian Federation in 2005, when the events of the year 1612 have been celebrated instead of those of 1917 every 4 November since. The day is also the feast day of the Russian Orthodox icon of Our Lady of Kazan.

Popularity
According to a  poll in 2007, only 23 percent of Russians know the name of the holiday, up from 8 percent in 2005. 22 percent identified the holiday as the Day of Accord and Reconciliation, the name of the holiday on  7 November during the 1990s. Only 4% knew that the holiday commemorates the liberation of Moscow from Polish invaders, and in 2005, only 5%.

Controversy
President Vladimir Putin reestablished the holiday in order to replace the commemoration of the October Revolution, known as the Day of Great October Socialist Revolution during Soviet period and as the Day of Accord and Conciliation in post-Soviet times, which formerly took place on 7 November. His decision angered some sections of the public, particularly the Communist Party, who continued with celebrations on 7 November. Putin's predecessor, Boris Yeltsin took a limited action of changing the name of the holiday; by completely removing it, Putin initiated a controversy that continues to this very day.

Events (2005 onwards)

2005
The center of the first of the revived tradition was Nizhny Novgorod, where monument to Kuzma Minin and Dmitry Pozharsky and Vladimir Putin laid flowers. The Patriarch of Moscow and all Rus', Alexy II  was also in attendance. Activities in Moscow, included two processions and a "Russian March". Religious processions occurred with local heads of administration in attendance. Fundraisers were held in Tula, a district art festival occurred for children with disabilities, and in Kaluga, veterans and orphans were given local confectionery products.

2006
A Russian March took place, despite bans in cities such as Moscow. A ninety-minute show involving more than a thousand actors was staged in Nizhny Novgorod.

2007
1612, Vladimir Khotinenko's historical film dramatizing the event the holiday commemorates, was released on November 1. Thirty-nine events were held in Moscow alone. Vladimir Putin laid flowers at the monument to Minin and Pozharsky and  presented the Pushkin Medal at a reception in the Moscow Kremlin, "for the preservation of Russian spiritual heritage" and "promotion of the Russian language".

2008

President Dmitry Medvedev laid flowers at the monument to Minin and Pozharsky and organized a reception in the Grand Kremlin Palace. In Revolution Square, 7,000 attended a  meeting devoted to the Day of National Unity. Activists of the youth movement "Nashi" called for a day of "under the covers" - 10,000 young people gathered on Vasilevsky Descent Square to sew a patchwork of thousands into the so-called "blanket the world". There was a free rock festival "Call", aimed at combating negative phenomena among young people, such as drugs.

2010
A celebration was held of the consecration of the restored gate icon of St. Nicholas Mozhaiskogo on the Nikolskaya Tower of the Moscow Kremlin, with the participation of the Patriarch of Moscow and all Rus', Kirill I.

See also

Public holidays in Russia
Russian march 
1612, a historical film dramatizing the purpose of Unity Day
Unity Day (disambiguation), in other countries

References

Society of Russia
Public holidays in Russia
November observances
Russia
Autumn events in Russia